Mykola Kolisnyk (born 4 November 1988) is a Ukrainian statesman, as well as the Deputy Minister of Energy of Ukraine.

Early life 

Mykola Kolisnyk was born on 4th November, 1988, in Zbarazh, Ternopil Oblast, Ukraine.

Education 

In 2014, he graduated from Kyiv National Economic University, majoring in Jurisprudence.

Successfully completed specialized training abroad, in particular: JICA (Japan) courses on energy planning and management in energy markets; under the program BP & SOCAR az management in the energy sector - ADA University (Azerbaijan, Baku).

Career 

He started working in foreign commercial enterprises of the oil and gas complex.

For three years he worked at the Antimonopoly Committee of Ukraine.

From 2016 to 2022, he worked his way up from chief specialist to director of the Directorate at the Ministry of Energy. He worked on the implementation of European legislation, in particular EU Regulations and Directives, on the security of natural gas supply, on daily balancing on the natural gas market, implementation of technical regulations on the quality of light petroleum products, coordinated cooperation with the NATO Energy Security Center on strengthening the security of critical energy infrastructure facilities. He was engaged in the development and implementation of MFI and MTD projects in the energy sector, more than 64 projects of Ukrtransgaz, OGTSU, NJSC Naftogaz of Ukraine.

From May 2018 until the appointment to the post of Deputy Minister has been working as Head of the Directorate of the Oil and Gas Complex and Development of Oil, Natural Gas and Oil Products Markets.

Ensured policy formation in the oil and gas complex, interaction with the enterprises of the oil and gas complex, implementation of projects to increase gas production, and signing of agreements on product distribution.

On May 13, 2022, he was appointed Deputy Minister of Energy of Ukraine.

He is a representative of the Ministry at the International Energy Charter and a natural gas expert in the UNECE.

References 

Living people
1988 births
People from Zbarazh
Kyiv National Economic University alumni
Ukrainian politicians